Carlo Maria Rosini (7 April 1748, in Naples – 18 February 1836, in Naples) was a Roman Catholic priest, bishop and philologist. Rosini worked on the carbonized papyrus scrolls found at Herculaneum, the first volume of which he helped publish in 1793.

Biography 
Carlo Maria Rosini studied under the Jesuits, embraced the ecclesiastical life, and in 1784 became the successor of Nicola Ignarra as professor of Holy Scripture in the archiepiscopal seminary at Naples. He was canon of Naples Cathedral till 1792. Pope Pius VI made him Bishop of Pozzuoli on 21 December 1797. He was in favor with the king, and received the position of Councilor of State and grand almoner, and later, under Ferdinand I, was minister of public instruction. Rosini was a member of the Royal Herculaneum Academy after its reorganization, and was one of the most active in deciphering ancient manuscripts, of which he published a great number. They are included in the Herculanensia Volumina (Naples, 1793). Rosini died at Naples on February 18, 1836. His works are all on archaeological subjects, the principal one being Dissertatio isagogica ad Herculanensium Voluminum explanationem (ibid. 1797), a long treatise about the excavations happening at Herculaneum.

References

Bibliography

External links
 
  (for Chronology of Bishops) 
  (for Chronology of Bishops) 

Bishops of Pozzuoli
Clergy from Naples
1748 births
1836 deaths
Philologists